Jean-Pierre "Jempy" Drucker (born 3 September 1986) is a retired Luxembourgish professional racing cyclist.

Career

Fidea (2004–2008)
He rode with this team for five seasons, winning two elite national cyclo-cross championships. He was selected to represent Luxembourg at the World Road Race Championships in 2008, but failed to finish.

Team Differdange (2009–2010)
For the 2009 season, Drucker joined . His success in cyclo-cross continued, winning two more national titles. Drucker went to the World Road Race Championships for the second time in 2009, but again did not finish. He won the prologue of the Flèche du Sud, a UCI 2.2 road race in 2010. Drucker also placed second in the Grote Prijs Stad Zottegem that season.

Wanty–Groupe Gobert (2011–2014)
Spending four seasons with the team, he booked no wins, but did finish second overall in the Tour de Luxembourg.

BMC Racing Team (2015–2018)
While riding for this team, he won the 2015 RideLondon–Surrey Classic, a one-day race in the United Kingdom. Later that year, he was selected to ride in the Vuelta a España. Drucker finished the race in 118th place overall. Drucker's success continued with this team the following year, winning the prologue of the Tour de Luxembourg and the 16th stage of the Vuelta a España.

In May 2018, he was named in the startlist for the 2018 Giro d'Italia.

Retirement
Drucker announced his retirement via Twitter on 10 January 2022.

Major results

Road
Source: 

2003
 National Junior Road Championships
2nd Time trial
2nd Road race
2007
 6th Overall Mainfranken-Tour
2008
 3rd Road race, National Under-23 Road Championships
2009
 5th Grote Prijs Stad Zottegem
 9th Arno Wallaard Memorial
 10th Overall Flèche du Sud
 10th Münsterland Giro
2010
 1st Prologue Flèche du Sud
 2nd Grote Prijs Stad Zottegem
 4th Ronde van Midden-Nederland
 5th Nationale Sluitingsprijs
 7th Arno Wallaard Memorial
 7th Ronde van Noord-Holland
2011
 6th Grote Prijs Stad Zottegem
2012
 2nd Grote Prijs Stad Zottegem
 3rd Schaal Sels
 6th Paris–Brussels
 7th Omloop van het Houtland
 9th Grand Prix Pino Cerami
 10th Grand Prix Criquielion
2013
 3rd Road race, National Road Championships
 3rd Grand Prix d'Isbergues
 5th Overall Tour de l'Eurométropole
 5th Ronde van Zeeland Seaports
 6th Overall Tour de Wallonie
 7th Omloop van het Houtland
2014
 2nd Overall Tour de Luxembourg
 4th Dwars door Vlaanderen
 5th Arnhem–Veenendaal Classic
 5th Münsterland Giro
 5th Paris–Bourges
 6th Omloop Het Nieuwsblad
 6th Grote Prijs Jef Scherens
 6th Paris–Tours
 8th Grand Prix d'Isbergues
 9th Nokere Koerse
 10th Binche–Chimay–Binche
2015
 1st RideLondon–Surrey Classic
 1st Stage 1 (TTT) Vuelta a España
 2nd Time trial, National Road Championships
 5th Grand Prix Impanis-Van Petegem
 6th Kuurne–Brussels–Kuurne
 7th Overall Driedaagse van West-Vlaanderen
 10th Handzame Classic
2016
 1st Stage 16 Vuelta a España
 1st Prologue Tour de Luxembourg
 1st Stage 1 (TTT) Tirreno–Adriatico
 2nd Time trial, National Road Championships
 9th E3 Harelbeke
 10th Overall Ster ZLM Toer
 10th Paris–Tours
2017
 1st  Time trial, National Road Championships
 1st Stage 1 Tour de Luxembourg
 1st Stage 4 Tour de Wallonie
 1st Stage 1 (TTT) Tirreno–Adriatico
 2nd Primus Classic
 2nd Grand Prix Pino Cerami
 3rd Overall Tour du Poitou-Charentes
 4th Overall Dubai Tour
 4th Eschborn–Frankfurt – Rund um den Finanzplatz
 5th Tour de l'Eurométropole
 6th London–Surrey Classic
 10th Paris–Tours
2018
 2nd Tour de l'Eurométropole
 5th Grand Prix Pino Cerami
 6th Kuurne–Brussels–Kuurne
 6th Binche–Chimay–Binche
 7th London–Surrey Classic
 8th Overall Dubai Tour
2019
 6th Omloop Het Nieuwsblad
2020
 3rd Road race, National Road Championships
 5th Three Days of Bruges–De Panne
 7th Overall Okolo Slovenska
2021
 2nd Road race, National Road Championships

Classics results timeline

Grand Tour general classification results timeline

Cyclo-cross

2002–2003
 1st  National Junior Championships
2003–2004
 1st  National Junior Championships
 Junior Superprestige
2nd Sint-Michielsgestel
3rd Harnes
2004–2005
 1st  National Under-23 Championships
2005–2006
 1st  National Championships
 1st  National Under-23 Championships
2006–2007
 1st  National Under-23 Championships
 1st Grand Prix Pierre Kellner
 2nd Herdenkingscross Etienne Bleukx Under-23
 3rd National Championships
 3rd Gieten, Under-23 Superprestige
2007–2008
 1st  National Championships
 1st Grand Prix Julien Cajot
 2nd Overall Under-23 Superprestige
1st Hoogstraten
2nd Vorselaar
3rd Diegem
3rd Gieten
 2nd Hoogerheide, UCI Under-23 World Cup
 3rd GP Stad Hasselt Under-23
2009–2010
 1st  National Championships
2010–2011
 1st  National Championships

References

External links

1986 births
Living people
Luxembourgian male cyclists
Luxembourgian Vuelta a España stage winners
People from Luxembourg (canton)
Cyclo-cross cyclists